Wołowa  is a village in the administrative district of Gmina Bulkowo, within Płock County, Masovian Voivodeship, in east-central Poland.

Its population as recorded in the 2011 census was 148.

References

Villages in Płock County